Anne Kang (born 1977) is a Canadian politician who has represented the electoral district of Burnaby-Deer Lake in the Legislative Assembly of British Columbia since 2017. A member of the British Columbia New Democratic Party (BC NDP) caucus, she has served in the cabinet of British Columbia since 2020, currently as Minister of Municipal Affairs. Prior to her election as Member of the Legislative Assembly (MLA), Kang served as a city councillor in Burnaby for three terms.

Early life and education
Born in Changhua County, Taiwan, Kang immigrated to Canada as a child, and has lived in Burnaby, British Columbia since 1986. She grew up in the Deer Lake neighbourhood, and graduated from Vancouver's David Thompson Secondary School with Honours in the Math & Science Program.

She completed her post-secondary education at the University of British Columbia, receiving a Bachelor of Music, a Bachelor of Education (Elementary), and Diploma in Special Education (Learning Disability). Kang has received a Master’s Degree in Special Education (Gifted and Creative Learning) and completed two levels of Montessori Certification. She continued to further her education, obtaining certificates in Sustainable Business Strategy from Harvard University, and certificates in Change Leadership, and Financial Accounting, both from Cornell University.

Kang's personal interests are in the areas of social sustainability, youth and young adults, education and immigration.

Community involvement 
Kang has volunteered, and held positions with a number of not-for-profit and community organizations. These include:
 Founding Director, Global Federation of Chinese Business Women Association of British Columbia
 Director, Progressive Housing Society
 Founding Director, TIO Group of Young Professionals
 Director, Taiwanese-Canadian Association
 Founding Director, Taiwanese Heritage Association
In recognition of her community involvement, she was awarded the Queen's Diamond Jubilee Medal in 2012.

Kang has also spoken about her challenges with stuttering, and the need to end the stigmatization of those with the condition.

Municipal politics (2008-2017)

Kang first ran for office in the 2008 municipal election as a candidate for the Burnaby Citizens Association, and was elected as a councillor on Burnaby City Council. She won re-election twice, serving as councillor for a total of three terms.

As a city councillor, Kang served the community of Burnaby through several sub-roles such as 
 Council Liaison for the Public Library Board
 Vice Chair of the Environment Committee
 Member of the Public Safety Committee
 Council Youth Liaison.

Kang also led environmental initiatives and infrastructure projects while on Council - fostering the development of a food scrap recycling program, and planning the renovation and restructuring of the city's main library.

Effective June 27, 2017, Kang was on unpaid leave from her position as Burnaby city councillor due to her recent election to the Legislative Assembly of British Columbia. Her vacant position on Burnaby City Council was left unfilled until the 2018 municipal election.

Provincial politics (2017-present)
The incumbent MLA for Burnaby-Deer Lake Kathy Corrigan (BC NDP) announced in 2016 her decision to not seek re-election in the next provincial election. Kang was acclaimed as the NDP's candidate for the riding in May 2016, then won the seat in the 2017 provincial election. She is among the first three Taiwanese-Canadians to be elected to the Legislative Assembly of British Columbia, alongside fellow New Democrats Katrina Chen and Bowinn Ma.

She was named Parliamentary Secretary for Seniors within the Government of British Columbia in July 2017, additionally serving as Parliamentary Secretary for Multiculturalism as of July 2019. She was appointed Minister of Citizens' Services in January 2020.

Kang won re-election as MLA for Burnaby-Deer Lake in the 2020 provincial election, and was named Minister of Advanced Education, Skills and Training in November 2020. She was subsequently named Minister of Municipal Affairs in the Eby ministry on December 7, 2022.

Electoral record

References

External links

MLA: Hon. Anne Kang – Legislative Assembly of British Columbia biography

British Columbia New Democratic Party MLAs
British Columbia school board members
Burnaby city councillors
Living people
People from Changhua County
Taiwanese emigrants to Canada
University of British Columbia alumni
Women MLAs in British Columbia
Women municipal councillors in Canada
21st-century Canadian politicians
1977 births
Canadian politicians of Chinese descent